Patrick O'Dell is an American photographer, filmmaker, skateboarder, and skateboard journalist from Columbus, Ohio.

Career

Epicly Later'd 
In 2004 O'Dell started Epicly Later’d, one of the first skate-related blogs. Epicly Later'd evolved into a web-series and television show where O'Dell conducts long-form interviews of skateboarders.

Dumb: The Story of Big Brother Magazine 
O'Dell directed Dumb: The Story of Big Brother Magazine, an American documentary film that premiered on Hulu on June 3, 2017. The film explores the rise and fall of skateboarding magazine Big Brother.

Music videos 
In 2008, O'Dell directed All You Need Is Me by Morrissey. In 2010, O'Dell directed the Wavves music video "Post Acid" starring Kevin Long as a skateboarding alien. In 2013, O'Dell directed I Don't Know How by Best Coast.

References

External links
 John Cardiel: Epicly Later'd by Patrick O'Dell
 Patrick O'Dell: Director's Interview | VANS
 The Poundcast - 152: Patrick O'Dell 
 Patrick O'Dell Talks Skateboard Media - 2020

American skateboarders
Skateboarding mass media
American male journalists
American music video directors
Skateboarding video directors
American photographers
Year of birth missing (living people)
Living people